Yadav "Nick" Nathwani (born August 15, 1983) is an American politician and former Republican member of the Illinois Senate from the 24th district. The district includes all or parts of Clarendon Hills, Downers Grove, Elmhurst, Glen Ellyn, Hinsdale, Lisle, Lombard, Oak Brook, Villa Park, Western Springs, Westmont, and Willowbrook.

Nathwani was appointed to serve out the remaining 6 weeks left  Chris Nybo term of office when he resigned after his defeat in November 2018 to Suzy Glowiak for Illinois Senate. Suzy Glowiak, took office on January 7, 2019.

Nathwani currently is a trustee of Milton Township, as well as a Milton Township Republican committeeman and was chosen fill the balance of Chris Nybo's term, by the DuPage County Republican Central Committee.

Nathwani was the first Indian-American to serve in the Illinois State Senate having been appointed to a six-week lame duck session before Ram Villivalam, the first Indian-American elected to the Illinois Senate, took office.

Education and career 

Nathwani earned his bachelor's degree and his MBA from Benedictine University in Lisle, Illinois.  He was elected as a trustee to Glenbard High School District 87 and served from 2009 until 2013.  In 2013, he was elected to be a trustee for Milton Township. He ran for re-election in 2017.  Nathwani serves as chief financial officer for Professional Paving and Concrete Company and had previously worked at a local bank.

References

External links
 Official profile at Illinois General Assembly

Living people
Benedictine University alumni
Republican Party Illinois state senators
People from Glen Ellyn, Illinois
21st-century American politicians
American politicians of Indian descent
Asian-American state legislators in Illinois
1983 births
Gujarati people
American people of Gujarati descent
School board members in Illinois
Asian conservatism in the United States